Ian Gibbons may refer to:

 Ian R. Gibbons (1931–2018), biophysicist and cell biologist
 Ian Gibbons (biochemist) (1946–2013), chief scientist of Theranos
 Ian Gibbons (musician) (1952–2019), English keyboardist
 Ian Gibbons (footballer) (born 1970), English football player